Paul Trijbits is a Dutch-born film and television producer living in London, with his wife Patricia and children Jakob and Lea.

Career 

Before joining the UK Film Council, Paul Trijbits produced a number of feature films including Richard Stanley's Hardware and Danny Cannon's The Young Americans. Trijbits was a founder member and former co-chair of the New Producers Alliance (NPA). He is currently CEO of FilmWave, the company he founded in 2012 with Christian Grass.

UK FilmCouncil (2000 - 2006)

In 2000, Paul Trijbits was appointed Head of the New Cinema Fund at the UK Film Council. During his six-year tenure, key initiatives such as the Berlinale Talent Campus were launched and he supported films such as Bloody Sunday (Golden Bear, Berlin 2002), 'The Magdalene Sisters (Golden Lion, Venice 2002). In 2006, New Cinema Fund supported Ken Loach's The Wind that Shakes the Barley and Andrea Arnold's Red Road won the Palme D'Or and the Prix du Jury in Cannes, respectively. 

Ruby Films (2007-2012)

In 2007, Trijbits joined Alison Owen's production company Ruby Films. Credits include Cary Fukunaga's Jane Eyre, starring Mia Wasikowska, Michael Fassbender & Judi Dench; Stephen Frears' Tamara Drewe, starring Gemma Arterton; and Disney's Saving Mr. Banks, starring Emma Thompson & Tom Hanks. He also executive produced Andrea Arnold's Fish Tank (Prix de Jury, Cannes Film Festival 2006), Oliver Hirschbiegel's Five Minutes of Heaven (Best Director & Screenplay Sundance Film Festival 2009); International Emmy award winning TV series Small Island based on Andrea Levy's much praised novel, starring Naomie Harris, David Oyelowo, Benedict Cumberbatch & Ruth Wilson; Stephen Poliakoff's Golden Globe winner Dancing On The Edge, starring Helena Bonham Carter, which had its gala premiere at the 61st Berlin International Film Festival. 

FilmWave (2012–present)

With Anthony Bregman's Likely Story, Trijbits co-produced Sing Street, directed by John Carney (Once & Begin Again), and Every Day based on David Levithan's YA novel for MGM. He also produced Alone in Berlin, with Emma Thompson & Brendan Gleeson and Martin Koolhoven's Brimstone starring Guy Pearce & Dakota Fanning. He executive produced J.K. Rowling's The Casual Vacancy for the BBC and HBO and in 2020 he launched the Netflix Original Series The Letter for the King, based on his favourite book when growing up in Holland.

Filmography

Feature films

Short films

Television

References

External links 
 
 Paul Trijbits at the British Film Institute
 Ruby Film and Television

Year of birth missing (living people)
Living people
Dutch emigrants to England
Businesspeople from London
Dutch film producers
Dutch television producers